Varkey Vithayathil (29 May 19271 April 2011) was an Indian cardinal, served as Head and Father of Syro Malabar Church and Major Archbishop of Ernakulam-Angamaly. He was also a religious priest of the Congregation of the Most Holy Redeemer.

Early life and ordination
Born to Joseph Vithayathil and Thresiamma Manadan in North Parur, Travancore, he became a member of the Congregation of the Most Holy Redeemer (Redemptorists), a religious congregation founded by Alphonsus Ligouri in 1732.  He was ordained as a priest on 12 June 1954. He was granted a doctorate in canon law from the Pontifical University of St. Thomas Aquinas (Angelicum) in Rome on The Origin and Progress of the Syro-Malabar Hierarchy. He taught for 25 years at the Redemptorist seminary in Bangalore. In 1972 he took his master's degree in philosophy from Karnataka University. He also taught different subjects in several other seminaries in Bangalore.

Provincial Superior
From 1978 to 1984 he was the Provincial Superior of the Redemptorist Provinces of India and Sri Lanka. Then, from 1984 to 1985 he was President of the India Conference of Religious. In 1990, he was appointed as the Apostolic Administrator of the Asirvanam Benedictine Monastery in Bangalore by Pope John Paul II.

Metropolitan and Gate of all India
He was appointed Apostolic Administrator of Ernakulam-Angamaly on 11 November 1996 and was consecrated a bishop on 6 January 1997. Pope John Paul II appointed him as the Major Archbishop of Ernakulam-Angamaly and Head of the Syro-Malabar Catholic Church, on 23 December 1999. In February 2008 he was elected President of the Catholic Bishops Conference of India and held the presidency from 19 February 2008 to 3 March 2010.

Cardinal
Pope John Paul II appointed Varkey Vithayathil a member of the Sacred College of Cardinals on 21 January 2001, and raised him to that dignity at the Consistory of 21 February 2001 becoming Cardinal-Priest of S. Bernardo alle Terme. He was one of the cardinal electors who participated in the 2005 papal conclave that elected Pope Benedict XVI.

Sacerdotal golden jubilee
The sacerdotal golden jubilee of Cardinal Varkey Vithayathil was celebrated under the auspices of the Syro-Malabar church on 8 November 2003. The jubilee was inaugurated on 12 June 2003 and was concluded on 12 June 2004.

Opinions

Fifth Marian dogma
Varkey Vithayathil supported proposals to solemnly proclaim a fifth Marian dogma on the co-redemption and mediation of graces, saying it would be beneficial to the Church and that it would have positive ecumenical effects.

Death
He died suddenly from a massive heart attack on 1 April 2011. He had suffered from prolonged heart problems for some time and died about 2:00 pm of sudden and irreversible cardiac arrest from the heart attack at Lisie Hospital in Ernakulam, where he had been hurriedly taken after fainting while celebrating Mass at noon in his chapel in the Major Archbishop's house, in Ernakulam. The funeral was held on 10 April 2011 at St. Mary's Cathedral Basilica, Ernakulam.

Works
The Origin and Progress of the Syro-Malabar Hierarchy, Thesis, Angelicum, 1959. Published: Oriental Institute of Religious Studies, India, 1980.
Straight From the Heart, autobiography and opinions in the form of an extended interview, 2009.

Further reading

Official biography at Archdiocese of Ernakulam
Cardinal Varkey Vithayathil, Cardinals of the Holy Roman Church 
Cardinal Varkey Vithayathil, Catholic Hierarchy

Notes

1927 births
2011 deaths
Malayali people
People from Ernakulam district
Redemptorists
Redemptorist cardinals
Pontifical University of Saint Thomas Aquinas alumni
Syro-Malabar Catholic Archbishops of Ernakulam-Angamaly
Indian cardinals
Cardinals created by Pope John Paul II